The Dauphiné Alps are a group of mountain ranges in Southeastern France, west of the main chain of the Alps. Mountain ranges within the Dauphiné Alps include the Massif des Écrins in Écrins National Park, Belledonne, Le Taillefer range and the mountains of Matheysine.

Etymology 
The Dauphiné is a former French province whose area roughly corresponded to that of the present departments of :Isère, :Drôme, and :Hautes-Alpes.

Geography 
They are separated from the Cottian Alps in the east by the Col du Galibier and the upper Durance valley; from the western Graian Alps (Vanoise Massif) in the north-east by the river Arc; from the lower ranges Vercors Plateau and Chartreuse Mountains in the west by the rivers Drac and Isère. Many peaks rise to more than 10,000 feet (3,050 m), with Barre des Écrins (4,102 m) the highest.

Administratively the French part of the range belongs to the French departments of Isère, Hautes-Alpes and Savoie.

The whole range is drained by the Rhone through its tributaries.

It has been proposed that the height of mountains in the Dauphiné Alps is limited by the erosion caused by small glaciers, causing a topographic effect called the glacial buzzsaw.

Peaks
The chief peaks of the Dauphiné Alps are:

Passes

The chief passes of the Dauphiné Alps are:

References

Maps
 French official cartography (Institut Géographique National - IGN); on-line version: www.geoportail.fr

 
Mountain ranges of the Alps
Mountain ranges of Auvergne-Rhône-Alpes
Mountain ranges of Provence-Alpes-Côte d'Azur